Mario Oscar Ferreyra, better known as Malevo Ferreyra (June 17, 1945 – November 21, 2008) was an Argentine police chief. Being a police officer during the last Argentine Dictatorship, he participated in the State terrorism, repressing left-wing guerrilla groups in Tucuman province. After the return of democracy, he would become the chief of Tucumán Provincial Police. In this position, Ferreyra became involved in the murder of guerrillas members, and innocent civilians suspected of the same. He would later be prosecuted and discharged from the force. He shot himself in 2008, when facing his imminent arrest, and his suicide was broadcast live on national TV.

Early life
Mario Oscar Ferreyra was born on June 17, 1945, in Los Pereyra, Cruz Alta, a locality east of San Miguel de Tucumán. When he was 18 years old, he enlisted in the police. He had been deemed physically unfit because of his small stature and low weight, but managed to enter the force thanks to a relative. 
In 1973, he fought against 15 demonstrators of the Juventud Peronista during a brawl downtown, in which he was hit with a glass bottle, leaving him a scar that would last for the rest of his life. Two years after this, he killed Julio Alsogaray, a militant of Montoneros guerrilla faction, in a one-on-one confrontation. He shot him with a FN FAL rifle. During the Military Junta rule, he was suspended for two years and five months, after being accused by his superiors of the senseless use of lethal force. In 1986, after the return of democracy, he was prosecuted for the killing of the well known criminal Enrique "Prode" Correa, but justice acquitted him for lack of evidence. 
One year later, when he was the chief of Robos y Hurtos, (Robbery Division of the Police,) he was involved in a shooting in the northern approaches to the city of San Miguel de Tucumán, in which two members of a prominent crime family were killed. In 1988, he was accused of the killing of another member of that same crime family, Daniel Carrizo, who had also been tortured in a cell of the Robbery Division's headquarters before his death. He was again acquitted. In January 1990, he was named chief of the General Investigations Division, and two months later led a police strike against governor José Domato, which forced the Gendarmería Nacional Argentina to take the law enforcing duties in the province until the dispute was resolved in his favor. This earned him the respect and affection of his co-workers.

Laguna de Robles
On October 10 of 1991, in Laguna de Robles, a rural locality in the northern area of Tucumán, three presumed criminals were found murdered. Their names were José "Coco" Menéndez, Hugo "Yegua Verde" Vera and Ricardo "El Pelao" Andrada. Ferreyra argued that the victims had been killed in an armed clash and formed part of a dangerous gang of robbers. In November of that same year, he accused some other high-ranking officers of misappropriation of public funds. These same police officers would, the day after the accusations, discharge him from the force. He was later accused of executing the three victims of the Laguna de Robles murders, and on December 9 he handed himself over to justice. 
The trial started on November 26, 1993. He was found guilty on December 14, but escaped the Courthouse by threatening to blow himself and the other people present in the room with a grenade he had brought hidden somewhere. 79 days later he was surrounded by federal forces in Zorro Muerto, in the neighboring province of Santiago del Estero. He was sent to Villa Urquiza prison, where he was supposed to spend 20 years. but was set free much sooner. The governor of Tucumán at the time, Antonio Domingo Bussi, was a former military officer who had taken part in the Process of National Reorganization and was fond of Malevo, so he reduced his sentence in 1996.

Later life and death
He would spend the rest of his life living in his property in San Andrés, a few kilometers from his place of birth. In 2008, during the trials for crimes against humanity that took place during the Kirchnerism government, he was again prosecuted for crimes he had supposedly committed during the Dirty War. On November 21, Gendarmería Nacional was sent to his house to arrest him. He climbed up a water tower and was followed by a TV camera crew from national news broadcaster Crónica TV. As he saw he had been surrounded by about 20 policemen, and with no intention of going back to prison, he took a gun and shot himself in the head. He had stated earlier that day that he would take any measure in order not to go to jail again. When asked if he was capable of killing himself, he said he'd do "Just like Hannibal". TV cameras captured this moment from a very close distance, as he was being interviewed and took this decision totally unexpectedly. His death was broadcast to the whole nation. He was survived by his wife and children.

See also
Christine Chubbuck
R. Budd Dwyer

References

1945 births
2008 deaths
Filmed suicides
Suicides by firearm in Argentina
Argentine police officers convicted of murder
Vigilantes
2008 suicides